Devashish Mahanti (born 23 December 1963) is an Indian former cricketer. He played first-class cricket for Delhi and Orissa between 1982 and 1990. He was a left-handed batsman and a right-armed medium pace bowler. His first-class cricket career began with his debut in 1982-83 representing Delhi against Bombay. He represented Delhi for a few years before moving back to Orissa. He continued to represent Orissa till 1989-90 when he decided to officially retire from cricket. He is one of the beneficiaries entitled to receive monthly gratis from the Board of Control for Cricket in India (BCCI).

References

External links
 

1963 births
Living people
Indian cricketers
Delhi cricketers
Odisha cricketers
People from Cuttack
Cricketers from Odisha